County routes in Oswego County, New York, are signed with the Manual on Uniform Traffic Control Devices-standard yellow-on-blue pentagon route marker. Routes typically have one or more road names in addition to their designation; however, several are known only by their route number.

Routes 1 to 50

Routes 51 and up

See also

County routes in New York
List of former state routes in New York (101–200)
List of former state routes in New York (201–300)

References

External links
Empire State Roads – Oswego County Roads